Events from the year 1771 in France

Incumbents
 Monarch – Louis XV

Events

Births
 
3 January – Louis Pierre Édouard, Baron Bignon, diplomat and historian (died 1841)
19 June – Joseph Diaz Gergonne, mathematician and logician (died 1859)
24 June – Éleuthère Irénée du Pont, chemical manufacturer (died 1834 in the United States)
18 August – Louis-François Bertin de Vaux, journalist (died 1842)

Deaths
20 February – Jean-Jacques d'Ortous de Mairan, geophysicist, astronomer and chronobiologist (born 1678)
27 December – Henri Pitot, hydraulic engineer, inventor of the pitot tube (born 1695)

See also

References

1770s in France